Niger competed at the 2010 Summer Youth Olympics, the inaugural Youth Olympic Games, held in Singapore from 14 August to 26 August 2010.

Fencing

Group stage

Knock-Out Stage

Swimming

References

External links
Competitors List: Niger – Singapore 2010 official site

2010 in Nigerien sport
Nations at the 2010 Summer Youth Olympics
Niger at the Youth Olympics